Carabus pseudomonticola is a species of black coloured ground beetle from Carabinae subfamily, that can be found in France and Spain.

References

pseudomonticola
Beetles of Europe
Beetles described in 1908